Abacaelostus filicornis is a species of beetle in the family Carabidae, the only species in the genus Abacaelostus.

References

Pterostichinae
Monotypic Carabidae genera